Emmanuel is a romanization of the Hebrew name Immanuel and can be used as a surname.

People
 Charles Emmanuel I of Savoy (1562–1630)
 Charles Emmanuel II of Savoy (1634–1675)
 Charles Emmanuel IV of Savoy (1751–1819)
 Victor Emmanuel I of Savoy (1759–1824)
 Victor Emmanuel II of Italy (1820–1878)
 Victor Emmanuel III of Italy (1869–1947) 
 Victor Emmanuel, Prince of Naples (b. 1937) 
 Charles Emmanuel III of Savoy (1701–1773)
 Emmanuel Adebayor (born 1984), Togolese football striker
 Emmanuel Banahene (born 1988), Ghanaian footballer
 Emmanuel Bett (born 1985), Kenyan long-distance runner
 Emmanuel Boileau de Castelnau (1857–1923), French mountain climber
 Emmanuel Callender (born 1984), Trinidadian sprint athlete
 Emmanuel Collard (born 1971), French racing driver
 Emmanuel Ellerbee (born 1996), American football player
 Emmanuel Farhi (1978–2020), French economist
 Eric Corley (pen name Emmanuel Goldstein), member of the hacking community
 Emmanuel de Grouchy, Marquis de Grouchy (1766–1847)
 Emmanuel Kiprono Kipsang (born 1991), Kenyan long-distance track runner
 Emmanuel Kwasi Kotoka (1926–1967), Ghanaian Army officer, member of the ruling National Liberation Council
 Emmanuel Kriaras, Greek lexicographer and philologist
 Emmanuel Lacresse (born 1971), French politician
 Emmanuel Lescure (?–2017), French businessman
 Emmanuel Levinas, French-Lithuanian Philosopher and Talmudic commentator
 Emmanuel Lewis, American actor
 Emmanuel Christopher Loblack (1898–1995), Dominican trade unionist and politician
 Emmanuel Macron (born 1977), President of France
 Emmanuel Maquet (born 1968), French MP
 Emmanuel Mbende (born 1996), Cameroonian footballer
 Emmanuel de Merode (born 1970), director of the Virunga National Park in the Democratic Republic of the Congo
 Emmanuel Moseley (born 1996), American football player
 Emmanuel J. Nuquay, Liberian politician
 Emmanuel Noi Omaboe (1930–2005), Ghanaian economist and public servant
 Emmanuel Otteh (1927-2012), Nigerian Roman Catholic bishop
 Emmanuel Pacquiao (born 1978), Filipino world champion professional boxer
 Emmanuel Rhoides (1836-1904), Greek writer and journalist
 Emmanuel Sanders (born 1987), American football player
 Emmanuel Danilo Clementino Silva, naturalized Equatoguinean football goalkeeper
 Emmanuel Tarpin (born 1992), French contemporary jewelry designer
 Emmanuel Yáñez, Uruguayan road cyclist
 Jesús Emmanuel Arturo Acha Martinez (born 1955), stage name Emmanuel, Mexican singer
 Esmé Emmanuel (born 1947), South African tennis player
 Maurice Emmanuel (1862–1938), French composer, teacher and musicologist
 Tommy Emmanuel (born 1955), Australian guitar player
 Ivor Emmanuel (1927—2007), Welsh singer and actor
 Mar Mari Emmanuel (born 1970), Australian metropolitan bishop
 Nathalie Emmanuel (born 1989), English actress

Fictional characters
 Emmanuel Goldstein (disambiguation), multiple characters

See also
Emanuel (name)

Given names
Modern names of Hebrew origin
French masculine given names
English masculine given names
Surnames
Theophoric names